Coenyropsis bera, the Bera brown, is a butterfly in the family Nymphalidae. It is found in southern Tanzania, Malawi, Zambia and northern Zimbabwe. The habitat consists of savanna, in areas with long grass on the lower slopes of hills.

Adults are on wing from November to December and from February to March, possibly in two generations per year.

References

Satyrini
Butterflies described in 1877
Butterflies of Africa
Taxa named by William Chapman Hewitson